Paul Curtis is an Australian rules footballer who plays for North Melbourne Football Club in the Australian Football League (AFL).

Early life
Curtis was raised in Melton, Victoria to a mother from Tonga (representing the country in netball at the Commonwealth Games) and an Australian father. He began playing for Melton South Junior Football Club before going on to play for the Western Jets in the NAB League as a small forward where he stood out catching the interest of recruiters from multiple AFL clubs. However prior to the draft, Curtis contracted COVID, resulting in his planned interviews with several clubs being placed on hold. He was drafted by North Melbourne Football Club with 35th selection in the 2021 National Draft.

AFL career

He had 11 disposals and kicked his first goal in the last quarter.

Statistics
 Statistics are correct to the end round 4 2022.

|- style=background:#EAEAEA
| 2022 ||  || 25
| 1 || 1 || 3 || 7 || 4 || 11 || 4 || 2 || 1.0 || 3.0 || 7.0 || 4.0 || 11.0 || 4.0 || 2.0
|- class="sortbottom"
! colspan=3| Career
! 1
! 1 
! 3 
! 7
! 4 
! 11 
! 4 
! 2
! 1.0
! 3.0
! 7.0
! 4.0
! 11.0
! 4.0
! 2.0
|}

References

External Links

2003 births
Living people
North Melbourne Football Club players
Western Jets players
Australian rules footballers from Victoria (Australia)
Australian sportspeople of Tongan descent
People from Melton, Victoria